Jared Mees is an American professional dirt track motorcycle racer. He competes in the AMA Grand National Championship winning the GNC1 title in 2012, 2014, and 2015, the Grand National Twins Championship in 2009, and the Grand National Singles Championship in 2012.

He is married to former professional motorcycle racer Nichole Cheza.

AMA Pro Flat Track
Mees secured the 2017 American Flat Track Championship with a victory at the Williams Grove Half-Mile event, clinching the championship with two rounds remaining in the season.

Superprestigio Dirt Track
As the 2014 Grand National Champion, Mees was invited to participate in the Superprestigio Dirt Track race on December 13, 2014, at the Palau Sant Jordi in Barcelona, Spain. He placed second to MotoGP Champion Marc Marquez in the final.

On December 12, 2015, Mees will again compete in the Superprestigio Dirt Track against a host of international racers and also against his countryman, Brad Baker.

X Games Harley-Davidson Flat-Track
Mees also competed in the 2015 X Games Harley-Davidson Flat-Track, leading until the final lap when his machine broke.

Indian Motorcycle Race 750 Test Rider
Mees tested for the Indian Motorcycle Manufacturing Company as an Indian Scout FTR750 rider.

Career highlights
 2002: Sportster Performance Champion – Harley-Davidson Sportster
 2004: AMA Rookie of the Year – Harley-Davidson XR-750
 2005: First Grand National race, Lima, OH – Harley-Davidson XR-750
 2006: 2nd, AMA Grand National Championship, First GNC Victory, Saluda, VA GNC Half-Mile Twins– Harley-Davidson XR-750
 2007: 2nd, AMA Grand National Championship – Harley-Davidson XR-750
 2009: AMA Grand National Twins Champion – Harley-Davidson XR-750 
 2010: 3rd, AMA Grand National Championship – Harley-Davidson XR-750
 2011: 2nd, AMA Grand National Championship – Harley-Davidson XR-750
 2012: AMA Grand National Champion – Harley-Davidson XR-750
 2013: 4th, AMA Grand National Championship – Harley-Davidson XR-750
 2014: AMA Grand National Champion – Harley-Davidson XR-750
 2015: AMA Grand National Champion, Winner of inaugural Superprestigio of the Americas – Harley-Davidson XR-750, Honda CRF450R
 2016: 2nd, AMA Grand National Championship – Harley-Davidson XR-750
 2017: AMA Grand National Champion – Indian Scout FTR750
 2018: AMA Grand National Champion – Indian

References

External links
 

1986 births
Living people
American motorcycle racers
AMA Grand National Championship riders
People from Chester County, Pennsylvania